The 1939–40 Svenska Serien season was the fifth season of the Svenska Serien, the top level ice hockey league in Sweden. Hammarby IF won the league title for the second consecutive season.

Final standings

External links
1939-40 season

Swe
1939–40 in Swedish ice hockey
Svenska Serien (ice hockey) seasons